The Seaforth Highlanders (Ross-shire Buffs, the Duke of Albany's) was a line infantry regiment of the British Army, mainly associated with large areas of the northern Highlands of Scotland. The regiment existed from 1881 to 1961, and saw service in World War I and World War II, along with many smaller conflicts. In 1961 the regiment was amalgamated with the Queen's Own Cameron Highlanders to form the Queen's Own Highlanders (Seaforth and Camerons), which merged, in 1994, with the Gordon Highlanders to form the Highlanders (Seaforth, Gordons and Camerons). This later joined the Royal Scots Borderers, the Black Watch, the Royal Highland Fusiliers and the Argyll and Sutherland Highlanders to create the present Royal Regiment of Scotland.

History

Formation
The regiment was created in 1881 through the amalgamation of the 72nd (Duke of Albany's Own Highlanders) Regiment of Foot and the 78th (Highlanders) (Ross-shire Buffs) Regiment of Foot – which became the 1st and 2nd battalions of the new regiment – and was part of the Childers Reforms of the British Army. It was named after Kenneth Mackenzie, 1st Earl of Seaforth, and his cousin Francis Mackenzie, 1st Baron Seaforth, who originally raised respectively the 72nd and 78th regiments. Originally named "Seaforth Highlanders (Ross-shire Buffs)", on 22 November 1881 Queen Victoria approved the regiment's style as "Seaforth Highlanders (Ross-shire Buffs, The Duke of Albany's)".

The 1st battalion saw action at the Battle of Tel el-Kebir in September 1882 during the Anglo-Egyptian War. After returning home, the battalion again went abroad in 1896, taking part in the International Occupation of Crete in 1897 and the reconquest of the Sudan, being present at the Battle of Atbara in April and the Battle of Omdurman in September 1898. It then moved to Cairo, and from late 1902 was posted to India, where it was stationed at Nasirabad, Ajmer.

In 1881, the 2nd battalion was stationed in India. It saw service on the North West Frontier, taking part in the Hazara Expeditions in the summer 1888 and the spring of 1891, and the Chitral Expedition in spring 1895. Returning home in 1897, the outbreak of the Second Boer War saw the 2nd Battalion travel to South Africa in November 1899, suffering heavy losses at the Battle of Magersfontein in December 1899 and at the Battle of Paardeberg in February 1900.

The 3rd, Militia battalion (formerly the Highland Rifle Militia), was embodied in late 1899, and embarked in February 1900 for service in Egypt alongside the 1st battalion.

In 1908, the Volunteer Force and Militia were reorganised nationally, with the former becoming the Territorial Force and the latter the Special Reserve; the regiment now had one Reserve and three Territorial battalions.

First World War

Regular Army
Commanded by Archibald Ritchie, the 1st Battalion, which had been serving in India, landed at Marseilles as part of the Dehra Dun Brigade in the Meerut Division in October 1914 for service on the Western Front. It saw action at the Battle of Aubers Ridge in May 1915. The battalion then moved to Mesopotamia in December 1915, where it took part in the Siege of Kut later that month and the Fall of Baghdad in March 1917, before moving to Palestine in January 1918.

The 2nd Battalion, which had been stationed at Shorncliffe Camp, landed at Boulogne-sur-Mer as part of the 10th Brigade in the 4th Division in August 1914. It took part in the retreat from Le Cateau later that month, the Battle of the Marne in September 1914, the Battle of the Aisne also in September 1914 and the Battle of Messines in October 1914. It went on to fight in the Second Battle of Ypres in April 1915, the Battle of the Somme in Autumn 1916 and the Battle of Arras in April 1917. The battalion also saw action at the Battle of Passchendaele in Autumn 1917, the Battle of the Lys in April 1918, the battles of the Hindenburg Line and the final advance in Picardy.

Territorial Force

The 1/4th (Ross Highland) Battalion landed at Le Havre as part of the 152nd Brigade in the 51st (Highland) Division in November 1914. The 1/5th (Sutherland and Caithness) Battalion and the 1/6th (Morayshire) Battalion both landed in France as part of the 152nd Brigade in the 51st (Highland) Division in May 1915. All three battalions continued to serve on the Western Front until the end of the war.

New Armies

The 7th (Service) Battalion landed at Boulogne-sur-Mer as part of the 26th Brigade in the 9th (Scottish) Division in May 1915. The 8th (Service) Battalion landed at Boulogne-sur-Mer as part of the 44th Brigade in the 15th (Scottish) Division in July 1915. The 9th (Service) Battalion landed at Boulogne-sur-Mer as part of the pioneer battalion for the 9th (Scottish) Division in May 1915. All three battalions continued to serve on the Western Front until the end of the war.

The 1st Garrison Battalion landed in Salonika as part of the 228th Brigade in the 28th Division in August 1916 for service on the Salonika front.

Interwar years
The 1st Battalion returned from Egypt in 1919, and in 1921 was deployed to Cowdenbeath and to Bridge of Allan to maintain order during strike action by the miners. It moved to Palestine in 1933 and to Hong Kong in 1937. In March 1938, the 1st Battalion was deployed to Shanghai. Meanwhile, the 2nd Battalion went to India in 1918 and saw action on the North-West Frontier in 1930–31 before moving to Palestine in 1932 and returning to Britain in 1934.

In 1921, the Seaforth's contribution to the Territorial Army was reorganised to comprise a now amalgamated 4/5 battalion, and the 6th battalion. The increase in the size of the Territorials in 1939 led to an expansion to four Seaforth units – the 4th, 5th, 6th and 7th Territorial battalions.

Second World War

The 1st Battalion, which was stationed in Shanghai when war broke out, was deployed to Malaya in November 1940, and then to India. It joined the 1st Indian Brigade in the 23rd Indian Division in May 1942, and served in the Burma Campaign until 1945.

The 2nd Battalion went to France as part of the 152nd Brigade in the 51st Highland Division with the British Expeditionary Force (BEF) in October 1939 but was captured at Saint-Valery-en-Caux during the Battle of France in June 1940. The 2nd Battalion was reconstituted, as part of the reconstituted 152nd Brigade, 51st (Highland) Division, and served in the Middle East, fighting in the Second Battle of El Alamein, and the subsequent Tunisia Campaign, and in the Allied invasion of Sicily. In late 1943 the 51st Division returned to the United Kingdom and then took part in Operation Overlord, the Allied invasion of Normandy, taking part in Operation Totalize and Operation Astonia, the capture of the French port of Le Havre. The battalion later participated in Operation Veritable, Operation Plunder and the invasion of Germany.

The 4th Battalion also went to France as part of the 152nd Brigade in the 51st Highland Division with the BEF in January 1940 and was captured at Saint-Valery-en-Caux in June 1940.

After home service with the 9th (Highland) Division, in 1940 the 5th Battalion joined the reconstituted 152nd Brigade, 51st Highland Division, and served in the Middle East, in the Allied invasion of Sicily in July 1943, in the Allied invasion of Italy in September 1943 and then in North-West Europe.

The 6th Battalion was a 2nd Line TA unit that was transferred to the 17th Infantry Brigade, part of the 5th Infantry Division. It served with the division throughout the war in Sicily, Italy, and finally in Northwest Europe.

The 7th Battalion was a 2nd Line TA unit that originally served with the 26th Infantry Brigade, part of the 9th (Highland) Division, and later transferred to the 46th (Highland) Infantry Brigade in the 15th (Scottish) Infantry Division and deployed to France in June 1944: it saw action in Operation Epsom and then served in North-West Europe.

The 8th and 9th battalions were raised early in the war, and served in a home defence and reserve role. In December 1941, the 8th was redesignated the 30th battalion, Seaforth Highlanders.

Post-war and amalgamation
After the end of war, the 1st battalion served in Java before moving to Malaya where, from 1948 until 1951, it took part in internal security operations during the Malayan Emergency. The battalion's postings then included Edinburgh (1951–2), Germany (1952–4), Suez Canal Zone, then Aden (1954–5), Gibraltar (1955–7), and Germany (1957–61).

In 1946 the 2nd battalion moved from Germany to England, where in 1948 it was disbanded, its personnel joining the 1st Battalion.

Post-war, the regiment had one Territorial Army (TA) unit – the 11th battalion, Seaforth Highlanders.

The 1st battalions of the Seaforth and Queen's Own Cameron Highlanders were amalgamated on 7 February 1961 at Redford Barracks to form the 1st battalion Queen's Own Highlanders (Seaforth and Camerons). The TA battalions of both regiments amalgamated in 1967 to form the 3rd (Territorial) battalion Queen's Own Highlanders.

Battle honours
These are the battle honours awarded to the Seaforth Highlanders, together with those of the 72nd and 78th Highlanders. Those borne on the Colours are in bold type.
 72nd Highlanders: Carnatic, Hindoostan, Mysore, Cape of Good Hope (1806), South Africa 1935, Sevastopol, Central India, Peiwar Kotal, Charasiah, Kabul 1879, Kandahar 1880, Afghanistan 1878–80
78th Highlanders: Assaye, Maida, Java, Koosh-Ab, Persia, Lucknow, Afghanistan. 1879–80
 Seaforth Highlanders (1881–1902): Tel-El-Kebir, Egypt 1882, Chitral, Atbara, Khartoum, Paardeberg, South Africa 1899-1902
 The Great War: Le Cateau, Retreat from Mons, Marne 1914 '18, Aisne 1914, La Bassée 1914, Armentières 1914, Festubert 1914 '15, Givenchy 1914, Neuve Chapelle, Ypres 1915 '17 '18, St. Julien, Frezenberg, Bellewaarde, Aubers, Loos, Somme 1916 '18, Albert 1916, Bazentin, Delville Wood, Pozières, Flers-Courcelette, Le Transloy, Ancre Heights, Ancre 1916, Arras 1917 '18, Vimy 1917, Scarpe 1917 '18, Arleux, Pilckem, Menin Road, Polygon Wood, Broodseinde, Poelcapelle, Passchendaele, Cambrai 1917 '18, St. Quentin, Bapaume 1918, Lys, Estaires, Messines 1918, Hazebrouck, Bailleul, Kemmel, Béthune, Soissonnais-Ourcq, Tardenois, Drocourt-Quéant, Hindenburg Line, Courtrai, Selle, Valenciennes, France and Flanders 1914–18, Macedonia 1917–18, Megiddo, Sharon, Palestine 1918, Tigris 1916, Kut al Amara 1917, Baghdad, Mesopotamia 1915–18
 The Second World War: Ypres-Comines Canal, Somme 1940, Withdrawal to Seine, St. Valery-en-Caux, Odon, Cheux, Caen, Troarn, Mont Pincon, Quarry Hill, Falaise, Falaise Road, Dives Crossing, La Vie Crossing, Lisieux, Nederrijn, Best, Le Havre, Lower Maas, Meijel, Venlo Pocket, Ourthe, Rhineland, Reichswald, Goch, Moyland, Rhine, Uelzen, Artlenberg, North-West Europe 1940 '44-45, El Alamein, Advance to Tripoli, Mareth, Wadi Zigzaou, Akarit, Djebel Roumana, North Africa 1942–43, Landing in Sicily, Augusta, Francoforte, Adrano, Sferro Hills, Sicily 1943, Garigliano Crossing, Anzio, Italy 1943–44, Madagascar, Middle East 1942, Imphal, Shenam Pass, Litan, Tengnoupal, Burma 1942-44

Victoria Cross recipients 

The following servicemen from the Seaforth Highlanders were awarded the Victoria Cross:

78th Highlanders
Andrew Bogle, 1857, Indian Mutiny
Joseph Crowe, 1857, Indian Mutiny
Herbert Macpherson, 1857, Indian Mutiny
Joseph Jee, 1857, Indian Mutiny
Valentine McMaster, 1857, Indian Mutiny
Stewart McPherson, 1857, Indian Mutiny
Henry Ward, 1857, Indian Mutiny
James Hollowell, 1857, Indian Mutiny
72nd Duke of Albany's Own Highlanders
Aylmer Cameron, 1858, Indian Mutiny
George Sellar, 1879, Afghanistan
Seaforth Highlanders
John MacKenzie, 1900, Ashanti
Sidney Ware, 1st Battalion, 1916, First World War
Walter Ritchie, 2nd Battalion, 1916, First World War
Thomas Steele, 1st Battalion, 1917, First World War
Donald MacKintosh, 2nd Battalion, 1917, First World War
Alexander Edwards, 6th Battalion, 1917, First World War
Robert McBeath, 5th Battalion, 1917, First World War
John Meikle, .4th Battalion, 1918, First World War

Colonels-in-Chief
1881–1884: Col. HRH Prince Leopold, Duke of Albany, KG, KT, GCSI, GCMG, KJStJ
1905: HRH Prince Charles Edward, Duke of Albany, KG, GCVO (terminated 1917)
1920: F.M. HM King Edward VIII (until abdication in 1936)

Regimental Colonels
Colonels of the Regiment were:
1881–1893 (1st Battalion): Gen. Sir Edward Selby Smyth, KCMG (ex 72nd Foot)
1881–1885 (2nd Battalion): F.M. Sir Patrick Grant, GCB, GCMG (ex 78th Foot)
1893–1897: Gen. Sir William Parke, KCB 
1897–1907: Gen. Sir Archibald Alison, Bt., GCB 
1907–1911: Lt-Gen. Mostyn de la Poer Beresford
1911–1914: Gen. Sir George Digby Barker, GCB 
1914–1924: Maj-Gen. Robert Hunter Murray, CB, CMG
1924–1931: Maj-Gen. Sir Colin Mackenzie, KCB
1931–1939: Maj-Gen. Sir Archibald Ritchie, KBE, CB, CMG
1939–1947: Lt-Gen. Sir William Montgomerie Thomson, KCMG, CB, MC
1947–1957: Maj-Gen. Sir Sir John Laurie, 6th Baronet, CBE, DSO
1957–1961: F.M. Sir James Cassels, GCB, KBE, DSO (to Queen's Own Highlanders)
1961 Regiment amalgamated with The Queen's Own Cameron Highlanders to form the Queen's Own Highlanders (Seaforth and Camerons)

References

External links
Clip of military parade in Shanghai in 1938 including 1st Battalion Seaforth Highlanders

Sources

Infantry regiments of the British Army
Highland regiments
Military of Scotland
Scottish regiments
Military units and formations established in 1881
Regiments of the British Army in World War II
Regiments of the British Army in World War I
1881 establishments in the United Kingdom
R